Shapeways, Inc. is a global, 3D printing marketplace and service, publicly traded company. Users design and upload 3D printable files, and Shapeways prints the objects for them or others.  Users can have objects printed in over 55 materials and finishes, these include: plastics, precious metals, steel and food-safe ceramics, which were discontinued and have been replaced by porcelain materials. As of 2021, Shapeways has printed and sold more than 20 million objects.

History

Early history 
Shapeways began as a spin-off of Royal Philips Electronics, the Netherlands in 2007. It was founded by Peter Weijmarshausen, Robert Schouwenburg and Marleen Vogelaar and the idea came forth at the Philips design department. The concept and venture plan was initially created in 2005 by Dolf Wittkämper within the `Philips Lifestyle Incubator` program which offers support for start-up companies with innovative ideas.

In 2008 a service was launched that allowed customers to design their own 3-dimensional products through rapid prototyping by sending a CAD-file to the Shapeways website to 3D print. Designers can also sell their own designs to be 3D printed on demand for customers, Shapeways handles the financial transaction, manufacture, distribution and customer service; profits go to the designer.

Originally the rapid prototyping could only print using simple materials. Later nylon was added as a possibility. In 2009 it was made public that they succeeded in also manufacturing stainless steel. As of 2012 the scale and possible materials have been further expanded to include sterling silver, acrylic, full color 3D printing and food safe ceramics.

On October 19, 2012 Shapeways opened a new '3-D printing factory' in Queens, New York that could house 50 industrial printers and produce millions of consumer-designed products a year.

The option now exist for consumers to adapt designs without prior knowledge of 3D design programming. There are models which can be adapted real-time by uploading new text or pictures: so-called 'Creators'. There is also the possibility of participating in Co-Creator platforms in which consumers and designers work together to achieve optimal results. In July 2014, Shapeways announced a partnership program with Hasbro, Inc. to produce 3D printed models of characters from My Little Pony: Friendship Is Magic based on designs created by the adult fan artists from the show and approved by Hasbro. The approach has been seen as a way to lead into other licensed media productions from Hasbro and other Hollywood companies.

On February 21, 2018, Shapeways named Gregory Kress as CEO, replacing Tom Finn.

Recent history 
In 2018, Shapeways announced an agreement with Stratasys to provide entrepreneurs better access to 3D full-color printing using a variety of materials. Since 2019, Shapeway has been able to produce PA-11, a material used in various industries such as aerospace, medical, automotive and more. In 2019, Shapeways celebrated its 10 millionth printed part. It produces up to 6,000 products daily and delivers to more than 130 countries.
In September 2019 Shapeways signed a partnership agreement with ZVerse, CADaaS platform, aiming to solve the problem of digital content creation. CADaaS platform enables to optimize 3D files that don't meet required standards and even create new 3D models directly within the Shapeways website. In 2020, Forward AM, BASF’s brand for high-performance materials and services for 3D printing, partnered with Shapeways to offer customers the ability to order 3D-printed items online made with Forward AM material. In 2021, Shapeways announced having 3D printed over 20 million parts for more than 1 million customers in 160 countries.

On April 28, 2021, Shapeways and Galileo Acquisition Corp. (NYSE: GLEO), a special-purpose acquisition company, entered into a definitive merger agreement for a merger transaction in which Shapeways will be acquired by Galileo. Upon closing of the transaction, the combined company will be named Shapeways Holdings, Inc. and is expected to remain listed on the NYSE under the new ticker symbol, SHPW. The combined company will be led by Greg Kress, Shapeways’ Chief Executive Officer.

See also

References

External links

3D publishing
Companies based in New York City
Companies listed on the New York Stock Exchange
3D printing websites
Dutch companies established in 2007
Special-purpose acquisition companies